Orlando Carlos Braga de Sá (born 26 May 1988) is a Portuguese retired professional footballer who played as a striker.

After spending his early career with Braga and Porto, appearing sparingly for both, he travelled abroad in 2011, going on to represent clubs in England, Cyprus, Poland, Israel, Belgium, China and Spain and win the Ekstraklasa and the Polish Cup with Legia Warsaw.

Sá earned one cap for Portugal.

Club career

Braga
Sá was born in Barcelos, Braga District. He started his career in the youth ranks of S.C. Braga, and was promoted to the first team for the 2007–08 season only to be loaned immediately to lowly SC Maria da Fonte (third division).

Sá returned to Braga in 2008, making his Primeira Liga debut on 5 January 2009 by playing one minute in a 2–0 home win against C.F. Os Belenenses. He scored his first goal in the competition on 8 March, as a late substitute in a 2–2 draw at C.F. Estrela da Amadora.

During his period in Braga, Sá gained attention from English club Chelsea, but nothing ever materialised.

Porto
On 1 June 2009, Sá moved to league champions FC Porto for an estimated fee of €3 million. Braga retained 20% economic rights on any future transfer fee, with an additional 20% being held by unknown parties. Having arrived still injured from his previous club, he only made his competitive debut on 2 January 2010, starting in a 2–0 away victory over U.D. Oliveirense in the fourth round of the Taça de Portugal.

Sá spent 2010–11 on loan to C.D. Nacional, appearing sparingly due to injury and technical decisions. His highlight was scoring the winner in a 2–1 home defeat of S.L. Benfica on 21 August 2010, and he finished the season with six official goals, plus one for the Portuguese under-23.

Fulham
At the end of the 2011 transfer window, Sá joined Premier League club Fulham on a free transfer, with Porto retaining 25% of his economic rights. He made his official debut for his new team in a Football League Cup tie against Chelsea at Stamford Bridge on 21 September (penalty shootout loss), and first appeared in the Premier League at West Bromwich Albion three days later, playing the full 90 minutes in a 0–0 draw.

Sá scored his first and only goal for Fulham on 31 December 2011, putting the visitors ahead in the seventh minute of the tie against Norwich City, in an eventual 1–1 draw. Early into the season, he struggled with the pace of the English game, but went on to adapt physically after a few months in the country, also stating he was improving his ability in the English language.

Before the 2012–13 campaign started, Sá said he was going to improve at Fulham and told the club's official website: "I feel that this is a really important pre-season for me, I want to be really prepared ahead of the new campaign because I want this year to be my year. I hope that I can score more goals like the one I got against Norwich. That was a good moment for me and I hope I will have many more moments like the one I experienced at Carrow Road". On 30 June 2012, however, his contract was terminated by mutual agreement.

AEL Limassol
On 30 July 2012, Sá signed a three-year contract with AEL Limassol. He scored his first goal in European competition on 6 December, helping his team achieve a 3–0 home win against Olympique de Marseille in the group stage of the UEFA Europa League.

Sá kickstarted the 2013–14 campaign by netting five times in only three Cypriot First Division matches. Coincidentally, the three opponents that suffered his accuracy in the first round of matches, Ethnikos Achna FC, APOEL FC and Enosis Neon Paralimni FC, met the same fate in the second.

Legia Warsaw

On 14 February 2014, Sá moved to Poland by joining Legia Warsaw on a three-and-a-half-year deal. He had arrived in Warsaw to undergo a medical the previous day.

Sá made his Ekstraklasa debut on 22 February 2014, in a 3–0 win over Górnik Zabrze. He scored his first goal on the last day of the regular season and contributed to a 3–1 victory at Zagłębie Lubin, as the Legionaires eventually won their tenth national championship.

Reading
On 29 June 2015, Sá signed for Reading on a three-year deal for an undisclosed fee. He made his debut for the club on 8 August in the season opener away to Birmingham City, having an added-time penalty saved by Tomasz Kuszczak in a 1–2 Championship defeat.

Sá scored his first goal on 29 August, heading home in a 3–1 away win against Brentford. In the following match, he hit a hat-trick in a 5–1 rout of Ipswich Town at the Madejski Stadium. He totalled five goals from 21 appearances across all competitions, with his presence eventually limited by new manager Brian McDermott.

Maccabi and Standard
On 26 January 2016, Sá signed a three-and-a-half-year deal with Maccabi Tel Aviv F.C. for an undisclosed fee. On 31 August, however, he joined Standard Liège for four seasons. He scored a career-best 17 goals – 20 across all competitions – in his first season with the latter, but they could only finish in ninth position in the Belgian First Division A.

On 28 February 2018, Sá transferred to Henan Jianye F.C. in the Chinese Super League. Within five months, however, he signed for Standard again.

Málaga
Sá moved teams and countries again on 13 August 2020, after agreeing to a one-year deal with Málaga CF of the Spanish Segunda División. On 26 May 2021, exactly on his 33rd birthday, he announced his retirement from professional football due to an achilles tendon injury.

International career
On 18 November 2008, in one of his first caps for the Portugal under-21 team, Sá scored a hat-trick against Spain in a 4–1 friendly home win. Only three months later, he was surprisingly called up to the senior squad by coach Carlos Queiroz for a friendly with Finland, and replaced Hugo Almeida at the hour mark in an eventual 1–0 victory in Faro.

Personal life
Sá married pop singer Teresa Villa-Lobos.

Club statistics

Honours
Porto
Taça de Portugal: 2009–10

Legia Warsaw
Ekstraklasa: 2013–14
Polish Cup: 2014–15

References

External links

1988 births
Living people
People from Barcelos, Portugal
Sportspeople from Braga District
Portuguese footballers
Association football forwards
Primeira Liga players
Segunda Divisão players
A.D. Esposende players
S.C. Braga players
FC Porto players
C.D. Nacional players
Premier League players
English Football League players
Fulham F.C. players
Reading F.C. players
Cypriot First Division players
AEL Limassol players
Ekstraklasa players
Legia Warsaw players
Israeli Premier League players
Maccabi Tel Aviv F.C. players
Belgian Pro League players
Standard Liège players
Chinese Super League players
Henan Songshan Longmen F.C. players
Segunda División players
Málaga CF players
Portugal youth international footballers
Portugal under-21 international footballers
Portugal international footballers
Portuguese expatriate footballers
Expatriate footballers in England
Expatriate footballers in Cyprus
Expatriate footballers in Poland
Expatriate footballers in Israel
Expatriate footballers in Belgium
Expatriate footballers in China
Expatriate footballers in Spain
Portuguese expatriate sportspeople in England
Portuguese expatriate sportspeople in Cyprus
Portuguese expatriate sportspeople in Poland
Portuguese expatriate sportspeople in Israel
Portuguese expatriate sportspeople in Belgium
Portuguese expatriate sportspeople in China
Portuguese expatriate sportspeople in Spain